Aq Bolagh (also Romanized as Āq Bolāgh, Ak-Bulak, Āq Būlāgh, and Āqbulāq) is a village in Qaqazan-e Gharbi Rural District, in the Central District of Takestan County, Qazvin Province, Iran. At the 2006 census, its population was 173, in 51 families.

References 

Populated places in Takestan County